CWLP may refer to:

Utilities
City Water, Light & Power, a public utility owned by the City of Springfield, Illinois.

Organizations
The Center for Work-Life Policy, a New York City-based think tank.
Commonwealth Labour Party, a former minor political party in Northern Ireland.